Hay Airport  is an airport serving Hay, a town in the western Riverina region of southwestern New South Wales in Australia. The airport is operated by the Hay Shire Council.

Facilities

See also
List of airports in New South Wales

References

External links
 

Airports in New South Wales